Mohammad Sabir Baburaj was an Indian music composer. He is often credited for the renaissance of Malayalam film music. Baburaj has rendered music to many evergreen Malayalam film songs.

Early years
Baburaj was born on 3rd March 1929 in Kozhikode, then known as Calicut. His early childhood was spent in destitution and poverty. His father, Jan Muhammed Khan, who was a Hindustani musician from Bengal who frequently held concerts in Kerala, deserted his Malayali mother when he was very young, and returned to his native Kolkata. Baburaj thus became fatherless, often singing songs in trains to make a living. But as luck would have it, a policeman, Kunjumuhammed (he was called Kunjumuhammed ika), an enthusiast of music from his native town of Kozhikode, noticing the boy's vocal talents, decided to virtually adopt him.

Music career
One of his greatest achievements was the introduction of Hindustani strains into Malayalam popular music. He successfully composed melodies based on Hindustani Ragas and blended Malayalam lyrics into them. Most of the lyrics were written by eminent Malayalam poets like P. Bhaskaran and Vayalar.

Baburaj learned basic lessons of Hindustani music from his father from a very young age, but he could not learn it for long due to his father's demise. In search of pure music, young Baburaj visited West Bengal, Mumbai and Sri Lanka. He learned to play the Harmonium during this period.

He came back to Kerala to a precarious existence. He sang on the streets of Kozhikode to earn his livelihood. Police constable Kunju Muhammed, who was a fan of Baburaj's father, adopted him and brought him up.

Later he started composing music for the Malayalam dramas in the Malabar region and thus slowly entered the field of music direction. In 1957, he composed music for the Malayalam film Minnaminungu, by Ramu Kariat, thus entering the Malayalam film industry. Then he worked with director P. Venu and composed classic songs like "Anuragaganam Pole", "Ezhuthiyatharanu Sujatha", and "Kalichirimaaratha Penne" for the film Udhyogastha (1967).

Baburaj was also an accomplished singer and harmonium player.

Baburaj died an early death, on 7 October 1978 at the age of 49. His death occurred in a general hospital in Madras, after suffering from a massive hemorrhagic stroke. He was survived by his wife and children.

Legacy

The Baburaj – P. Bhaskaran – Yesudas combination produced many of the most memorable Malayalam tunes of the 1960s and 1970s. Most of his classic duets were sung by P Leela, K. J. Yesudas and S. Janaki, each recording solo Baburaj compositions as well.
Many of Baburaj's songs remain very popular in Kerala, with songs like "Oru Pushpam Maatram" frequently rendered on stage at various events.

The Manorama Music company chanced upon an old audio cassette of Baburaj rendering some of his own compositions in a platform of friends' circle. The cassette named 'Baburaj Padunnu' was re-mixed and became an instant hit. The tracks gave Kerala a rejuvenated taste of Baburaj's music with his unique style of soulful singing.
Though a successful composer, Baburaj was never a careerist, but kept his focus on his art. Today, various clubs and musical organisations conduct stage programs in honour of Baburaj ('Babukka' to his friends and acquaintances), and give the proceeds to his family. During his time, money was not easy to come by for artists, and Baburaj never managed to earn much, dying in poverty. "Thrikkakkare theerthakkare" sung by P. Susheela in the 1978 film Yagaswam, directed by Hariharan, was his last recorded song.

In 1983, Baburaj posthumously received the Kerala Sangeetha Nataka Akademi Award in Light Music category.

Notable songs
 Thamasamenthe Varuvan Pranasakhi
 Anuraga Ganam Pole
 Oru Pushpam Mathramen Hridayathil Sookshikkam
 Vaasantha Panjami Naalil
 Ezhuthiyatharanu Sujatha
 Kanneerum Swapnangalum Vilkkuvanaayi Vannavan Njan
 Eeranuduthumkondambaram Chuttunna
 Aadiyil Vachanamundaayi
 Kalichirimaaratha Penne
 Vichana Theerame
 Innale Mayangumbol
 Thankam Vegam
 Chandramimbam Nenjilettum
 Pavada prayathil
 Annu ninte Nunakkuzhi
 Vellichilankayaninjum
 Kadali Vazha Kayyilirunnu
 Surumayezhuthiya Mizhikale
 Pathiravayilla Pournamikanyakku Pathinezhoe Pathinettoe Prayam
 Pottatha Ponnin Kinavu Kondoru Pattunoolonjala Ketti Njan
 Panja Varna Thatha Pole Konji Vanna Penne
 Pranasakhee Njan Verumoru
 Thaliritta Kinakkal Than Thamara Maala vangan
 Thaane Thirinjum Marinjum
 Sooryakanthee... Sooryakanthee...
 Oru Kochu Swapnathin Chirakumayi
 Kadale Neela Kadale
 Akale Akale Neelakasam
 Ikkarayanente Thamasam
 Pottithakarnna kinavinte
 Anjana Kannezhuthi
 Arabi Kadaloru Manavalan
 Kanmani Neeyen
 Kanmaniye Karayathurangu
 Adyathe Kanmani
 Innente Karalile
 Oru Kotta Ponnundallo
 Nadikalil Sundari Yamuna
 Thamarakumbilallo Mama Hrudayam
 Maamalakalkkappurathu
 Thedunnathaare shoonyathayil
 Anuraaga Nadakathin
 Aadanumariyaam
 Jeevitheswarikkekuvaanoru
 Kottum njan keettilla
 Kaanan pattatha kanakathin manimuthe

Filmography

The list of Malayalam films for which songs were composed by Baburaj 
 Minnaminugu	(1957)
 Umma	(1960)
 Kandam Becha Kottu	(1961)
 Mudiyanaya Puthran	(1961)
 Laila Majnu (1962)
 Palattu Koman (Konkiyamma)	(1962)
 Bhagyajathakam	(1962)
 Ninamaninja Kalpadukal	(1963)
 Moodupadam	(1963)
 Thacholi Othenan	(1964)
 Kuttikkuppayam	(1964)
 Karutha Kai	(1964)
 Bhargavi Nilayam	(1964)
 Bharthavu (1964)
 Subaidha	(1965)
 Kadathukaran	(1965)
 Porter Kunjali	(1965)
 Ammu (1965)
 Kuppivala	(1965)
 Thankakkudam	(1965)
 Kattuthulasi	(1965)
 Mayavi	(1965)
 Chettathi	(1965)
 Thommante Makkal	(1965)
 Sarppakkaadu	(1965)
 Maanikyakottaram	(1966)
 Penmakkal	(1966)
 Koottukar	(1966)
 Kaattumallika	(1966)
 Anarkali	(1966)
 Tharavattamma	(1966)
 Poochakkanni	(1966)
 Kanakachilanga	(1966)
 Iruttinte Athmavu	(1967)
 Agniputhri (1967)
 Balyakalasakhi	(1967)
 Udhyogastha (1967)
 Karutha Rathrikal	(1967)
 Khadeeja	(1967)
 Anweshichu Kandethiyilla	(1967)
 Collector Malathy	(1967)
 Pareeksha	(1967)
 Manaswini	(1968)
 Inspector	(1968)
 Kaarthika (1968)
 Lakshaprabhu	(1968)
 Love in Kerala	(1968)
 Midumidukki	(1968)
 Anchu Sundarikal (1968)
 Sandhya (1969)
 Velliyazhcha	(1969)
 Virunnukari (1969)
 Saraswathi (1970)
 Anadha (1970)
 Olavum Theeravum	(1970)
 Bheekara Nimishangal	(1970)
 Vivaham Swargathil	(1970)
 Ambalapravu (1970)
 Priya	(1970)
 Cross Belt (1970)
 Kuttyedathi	(1971)
 Manpeda	(1971)
 Lora Neeyevide	(1971)
 Rathrivandi	(1971)
 Puthenveedu	(1971)
 Ernakulam Junction (1971)
 Panimudakku	(1972)
 Pulliman	(1972)
 Sambhavami Yuge Yuge	(1972)
 Azhimukham	(1972)
 Mappusakshi	(1972)
 Bhadradeepam	(1973)
 Aaradhika (1973)
 Ladies Hostel	(1973)
 Soundaryapooja	(1973)
 Manassu	(1973)
 Chuzhi	(1973)
 Kaamini	(1974)
 Nathoon	(1974)
 Swarnna Malsyam	(1975)
 Bhaaryaye Aavashyamundu (Samarppanam)	(1975)
 Criminals (Kayangal)	(1975)
 Njaan Ninne Premikkunnu	(1975)
 Sthreedhanam	(1975)
 Appooppan (Charithram Aavarthikkunnilla)	(1976)
 Srishti	(1976)
 Pushpasharam	(1976)
 Allahu Akbar (1977)
 Dweepu	(1977)
 Yatheem	(1977)
 Gaandharvam (Kanakam)	(1978)
 Bhrashtu (1978)
 Yagaswam	(1978)
 College Beauty (1979)
 Krishnatulasi	(1979)

See also
 List of Indian composers

References

Sources
ബാബുരാജ് കരഞ്ഞു; വേദനയില്‍ അവസാനത്തെ ഈണം പിറന്നു...
Baburaj, through his wife’s eyes
baburaj chudukanneeralen jeevithakatha : Editor:Mustafa Desamangalam : 9788187474753 : Read @ JustBooksclc.
ചുടുകണ്ണീരാലെന്‍ ജീവിതകഥ

External links
 babukka.in

M. S. Baburaj the genius
Unforgettable Baburaj – The Hindu

 MS Baburaj at Malayalachalachithram.com
MS Baburaj at Malayalasangeetham.info 

Indian male composers
Malayalam film score composers
Musicians from Kozhikode
1929 births
1978 deaths
Harmonium players
20th-century Indian composers
Film musicians from Kerala
20th-century organists
Male film score composers
20th-century male musicians
Recipients of the Kerala Sangeetha Nataka Akademi Award